Øivind Breiby (15 November 1917 – 5 November 1990) was a Norwegian boxer. He competed in the men's lightweight event at the 1948 Summer Olympics.

References

1917 births
1990 deaths
Norwegian male boxers
Olympic boxers of Norway
Boxers at the 1948 Summer Olympics
Sportspeople from Oslo
Lightweight boxers
20th-century Norwegian people